Flamanville may refer to the following communes in France]:

Flamanville, Manche, in the Manche département 
 Flamanville Nuclear Power Plant
Flamanville, Seine-Maritime, in the Seine-Maritime département